A Chronicle of the Last Pagans is a 1990 popular history book on pagan retreat in the Roman Empire, written by historian Pierre Chuvin and published by Harvard University Press.

Legacy 

The book inspired the 2020 lo-fi album Songs for Pierre Chuvin by the Mountain Goats.

Notes

References

External links 

 
 

1990 non-fiction books
English-language books